Mohammad Moniruzzaman Miah ( – June 13, 2016) was a Bangladeshi academic. He served as the 20th vice-chancellor of the University of Dhaka from March 1990 until October 1992. He was awarded Ekushey Padak in 2004 by the Government of Bangladesh for his contribution to education.

Education and career
Miah completed his master's from the University of Rajshahi. He then joined as a faculty member of Jagannath College. After completing 5 years of studies in France, he joined University of Dhaka as a professor of the Department of Geography and Environment. In 1990, he was appointed as the vice-chancellor of the University of Dhaka.

In October 1992, Miah was selected as the Bangladeshi Ambassador to Senegal.

References 

1935 births
2016 deaths
University of Rajshahi alumni
Academic staff of Jagannath University
Recipients of the Ekushey Padak
Vice-Chancellors of the University of Dhaka
Burials at Banani Graveyard
Ambassadors of Bangladesh to Senegal